Ludwigia repens is a species of flowering plant in the evening primrose family known by the common name creeping primrose-willow. It is native to parts of the Americas and it has the potential to spread easily and become naturalized in many areas. It is known as an aquatic weed in some regions. It is also cultivated as an aquarium plant. This is a mat-forming perennial herb with a creeping stem up to 30 centimeters long, rooting at nodes which come in contact with wet substrate. The leaves are oppositely arranged and up to 4 or 5 centimeters long. The flower has four yellow colored petals no more than 3 millimeters long nested on a base of four pointed sepals which may be slightly longer.

References

External links
Jepson Manual Treatment
Photo gallery

repens
Flora of the Southern United States
Flora of the Caribbean
Taxa named by Johann Reinhold Forster